Jorge Alberto Molina Contreras (born 1956) is a retired Salvadoran military officer who served as Minister of National Defense of El Salvador from 1 January 2009 to 1 June 2009 during the last six months of the presidency of Antonio Saca.

References 

1956 births
Living people
Salvadoran military personnel
Defence ministers of El Salvador
People from San Salvador